The following radio stations broadcast on AM frequency 1240 kHz: 1240 AM is a regional (Class B) frequency outside the coterminous 48 United States (Alaska, Hawaii, Puerto Rico, & U.S. Virgin Islands), and a local frequency (Class C) within the coterminous 48 United States.

In Argentina
 Cadena Uno in Argentina
 LRI218 Universidad Nacional del Sur in Bahia Blanca, Buenos Aires

In Canada

In Mexico
 XEBQ-AM in Guaymas, Sonora
 XECG-AM in Nogales, Sonora
 XEMEFM-AM in Morelia, Michoacan
 XERD-AM in Pachuca, Hidalgo
 XEWG-AM in Cd.Juarez, Chihuahua

In the United States

See also
CONELRAD

References

Lists of radio stations by frequency